James Gould may refer to:

 James Gould (jurist) (1770–1838), jurist and professor at the Litchfield Law School
 James L. Gould (born 1945), American ethologist, evolutionary biologist, and popular science writer
 James Gould (rower) (1914–1997), New Zealand rower
 James Nutcombe Gould (1849–1899), English stage actor
 James Gould (died 1676) (1593–1676), Member of Parliament for Dorchester
 James Gould (died 1707) (1620s–1707), Member of Parliament for Dorchester, son of above
 James Childs Gould (1882–1944), Member of Parliament for Cardiff Central
 James J. Gould, member of the Michigan House of Representatives